Heinz Budweg (born 1 May 1940) is a German painter who currently resides in Sao Paulo, Brazil. Budweg is considered the best living artists in the speciality of painting the Indians of the Amazon Forest.

Early life and career

Born in Berlin, Germany, in 1940, Budweg immigrated to Brazil in 1953. He established himself in São Paulo, and he immediately started to demonstrate interest in the Brazilian Indian population. He has travelled many times to the Amazon Forest, as well as the Alto Xingu and the Marajó Island, always to look for inspiration. He has painted a vast collection of Indians portraits. He also won a Jabuti Trophy, one of the most prestigious awards in Brazil, thanks to his work in Lendas Brasileiras (Brazilian Legends), a book dedicated for children.

He became a Brazilian citizen in 1958.

His work was exposed in Brazil, Germany, Italy, the United States and Switzerland. Some of his paintings are permanently exposed in the Munch Art-Gallery, in Munich, Germany.

See also
 List of German painters

External links
http://www.budweg.com.br/
http://itaucultural.org.br/AplicExternas/enciclopedia_IC/index.cfm?fuseaction=artistas_biografia&cd_verbete=2006&cd_item=3&cd_idioma=28555
http://galileu.globo.com/edic/99/nos_arqueologia1.htm

1940 births
Living people
20th-century German painters
20th-century German male artists
German male painters
21st-century German painters
21st-century German male artists
German emigrants to Brazil